Rosalyn Randolph "Roz" Dance (born February 10, 1948) is an American politician, who served in the Senate of Virginia from 2014 until 2020. She was a member of the Virginia House of Delegates from 2005 to 2014, and was mayor of Petersburg, Virginia from 1992 to 2004. Dance is a member of the Democratic Party.

Early life 
Dance was one of 11 children. She dropped out of high school, but went on to earn several higher degrees.

Electoral history
Dance was elected to the Petersburg City Council in 1992.

In 2001, the 63rd Virginia House of Delegates district incumbent, Democrat Jay DeBoer, retired after 18 years. Dance, then mayor of Petersburg, ran for the seat as an independent but lost to the Democratic nominee, funeral director Fenton Bland.

On January 25, 2005, Bland pleaded guilty in federal court to a charge of conspiracy to commit bank fraud; he resigned the 63rd district seat the next day. Dance received the Democratic nomination and was chosen to replace Bland in a special election on March 22. The 63rd district is southeast of Richmond, made up of the city of Petersburg and part of Hopewell, plus parts of Chesterfield, Dinwiddie and Prince George Counties. Dance was reelected multiple times, the last in November 2013.

Dance served on the House committees on Appropriations, General Laws, Health, Welfare and Institutions, and Privileges and Elections.

Dance served in the Senate of Virginia, where she represented District 16, having won a special election on November 4, 2014, to fill the seat once held by Henry L. Marsh.

In 2019, Dance sponsored a bill to gradually increase Virginia's minimum wage from $7.25 an hour to $15 per hour by 2021. Later that year, she ran for reelection to her state senate seat, but was defeated in the primary by disbarred attorney Joe Morrissey.

References

External links
 (campaign finance)

1948 births
Living people
Democratic Party Virginia state senators
Democratic Party members of the Virginia House of Delegates
Women state legislators in Virginia
Virginia State University alumni
Virginia Commonwealth University alumni
Mayors of Petersburg, Virginia
People from Chesterfield, Virginia
21st-century American politicians
21st-century American women politicians
20th-century American politicians
20th-century American women politicians
Virginia city council members
Women city councillors in Virginia